Prosopochaeta caliginosa is a species of fly in the family Tachinidae described in 1971.

Distribution
Argentina, Chile.

References 

Diptera of South America
Dexiinae
Insects described in 1971